The second Johnson ministry began on 16 December 2019, three days after Boris Johnson's audience with Queen Elizabeth II where she invited him to form a new administration following the 2019 general election, in which the Conservative Party was returned to power with a majority of 80 seats in the House of Commons. Initially the ministers were largely identical to those at the end of the first Johnson ministry, but changed significantly in cabinet reshuffles in February 2020 and September 2021.

In July 2022, following a government crisis as a result of dozens of resignations from his government, Johnson resigned as leader of the Conservative Party. Johnson pledged to remain as Prime Minister and lead a 'caretaker' government until a new Conservative Party leader had been elected. The election results were revealed on Monday 5 September 2022, and the new leader Liz Truss became prime minister on 6 September, resulting in the cabinet's dissolution.

History

2019 to 2020 
The Conservative minority first Johnson ministry could not implement its legislative programme due to a political impasse over Brexit. While the Fixed-term Parliaments Act 2011 requires a two-thirds majority vote in parliament to trigger an election, Johnson bypassed this requirement by passing the Early Parliamentary General Election Act 2019. In the resulting election, held on 12 December 2019, Johnson's Conservatives won a majority of eighty seats, the largest for a government led by a Conservative prime minister since Margaret Thatcher in 1987.

Initially the ministers were largely identical to those at the end of the first Johnson ministry, excepting the Secretary of State for Wales, in which position Simon Hart replaced Alun Cairns. Nicky Morgan, who stood down at the general election, and Zac Goldsmith, who lost his seat, were made life peers to allow them to remain in the government.

Johnson reshuffled his cabinet on 13 February 2020: Sajid Javid, Julian Smith, Esther McVey, Geoffrey Cox, Andrea Leadsom, Theresa Villiers and Chris Skidmore all left the government.

Andrew Sabisky worked as a political adviser in Johnson's office for a short time in February. Sabisky, a speaker at the secretly held London Conference on Intelligence at UCL in 2015, believed that there were significant differences in average intelligence between different races, and supported enforced contraception. This caused concern among politicians of all parties in the UK Parliament only a few days after Sabisky's appointment. He resigned from his advisory role on 17 February 2020.

2021 to 2022 
The 2021 State Opening of Parliament took place on 11 May 2021. Johnson conducted a cabinet reshuffle on 15 September 2021. The 2022 State Opening of Parliament took place on 10 May 2022. Johnson conducted another cabinet reshuffle on 7 July 2022. In January 2022 researchers  at Sussex University maintained Johnson's administration was more corrupt "than any UK government since the Second World War" and feared serious consequences for the UK if it continued. Professor of Anti-Corruption Practice, Robert Barrington,  at the Centre for the Study of Corruption in Sussex University stated that Johnson directly influenced this by personal example and by allowing his ministers and staff to do things. Barrington feared "consequences for democracy and Britain's global influence" - Barrington feared further for the economy and national security. Barrington acused MPs or Ministers that failed to act against lack of integrity of enabling it.  Simon Jenkins wrote "He could never handle rivals near him, and his dismissal of May’s abler ministers deprived him, and the UK, of experience and ability in favour of second-rate acolytes."

Confidence vote and government crisis

On 6 June 2022, Boris Johnson faced a vote of confidence in his ministry. He won the vote, with 211 in favour of his premiership and 148 against. Johnson was politically weakened. 

In July 2022, several ministers resigned from the government in response to the handling of the Chris Pincher scandal, including cabinet ministers Sajid Javid, Rishi Sunak and Simon Hart. Michael Gove was sacked for disloyalty.

Johnson’s resignation 
Following the resignations, Johnson announced on 7 July 2022 of his decision to step down as Conservative Party leader. Following the completion of the leadership election for his successor on 6 September, he stepped down and was succeeded by Liz Truss.

Cabinets

December 2019 – February 2020

February 2020 – September 2021

Changes
 Following the merger of the Department for International Development into the Foreign and Commonwealth Office in September 2020, the office of International Development Secretary was abolished. Anne-Marie Trevelyan accordingly left the Cabinet and the Secretary of State for Foreign and Commonwealth Affairs became the Secretary of State for Foreign, Commonwealth and Development Affairs.
 Lord Frost became a full member of the Cabinet as a Minister of State in the Cabinet Office on 1 March 2021.
 Suella Braverman became Minister on Leave on 2 March 2021 with Michael Ellis replacing her as Attorney General. Mrs Braverman returned to the post of Attorney General on 13 September the same year.
 Matt Hancock quit his post of Health Secretary on 26 June 2021 following the revelation that he had breached coronavirus social distancing guidance. He was replaced by Sajid Javid.

September 2021 – February 2022

Changes
 Lord Frost resigned from the government on 18 December 2021. His role as Brexit minister was taken over by Foreign Secretary Liz Truss.

February 2022 – 5 July 2022

Changes
 Oliver Dowden resigned as Co-Chairman of the Conservative Party and Minister without Portfolio on 24 June 2022 following the Conservative defeats at the Tiverton and Honiton by-election and Wakefield by-election.

5 July 2022 – 6 September 2022

Changes
 Sajid Javid resigned as Secretary of State for Health and Social Care on 5 July. He was replaced by Steve Barclay, the former Chancellor of the Duchy of Lancaster, who is in turn replaced by Kit Malthouse, former Home Office minister as Chancellor of the Duchy of Lancaster.
 Rishi Sunak resigned as Chancellor of the Exchequer on  5 July. He was replaced by Nadhim Zahawi, formerly Secretary of State for Education.
 Michael Gove was dismissed from Secretary of State for Levelling Up, Housing and Communities on 6 July. He was replaced by Greg Clark.
 Simon Hart resigned as Secretary of State for Wales on  6 July. He was replaced by Robert Buckland, a former Secretary of State for Justice.
 Brandon Lewis resigned as Secretary of State for Northern Ireland on  7 July. He was replaced by Shailesh Vara.
 Michelle Donelan resigned as Secretary of State for Education on  7 July. She was replaced by James Cleverly, Minister of State for Europe and North America.
 The roles of Minister of State for Higher and Further Education and Minister for Crime and Policing were not designated as attending Cabinet.
 Andrew Stephenson joined the Cabinet as Minister without portfolio.

List of ministers

Prime Minister and Cabinet Office

Departments of state

Law officers

Parliament

See also
 First Johnson ministry
 Johnson cabinets, of Boris Johnson as Mayor of London.

Notes

References

Ministry, second
2019 establishments in the United Kingdom
2022 disestablishments in the United Kingdom
2010s in British politics
2020s in British politics
British ministries
Cabinets established in 2019
Cabinets disestablished in 2022
Ministries of Elizabeth II